Rowland Raymond Kaiza (born 1990), better known by his stage name BigTril is a Ugandan rapper, producer and songwriter. He is widely known for his  single hit "Parte After Parte".and giddem ft Beenie Gunter

Early life

Rowland was born in 1990 in Uganda. He was raised as the fourth child out of five by single mother, Esther Nankinga. He attended Turkish Light Academy for his O and A-levels before graduating and gaining admission to Makerere University for a bachelor's degree in Journalism and Mass Communication. He was a very smart student with good grades. He dropped out after one year to pursue a musical career.

Career

2010-2018: Career beginnings, minor hits with Baboon Forest Entertainment, signing to new label, Striker Entertainment
Rowland has stated his stage name, BigTril, to be an acronym for "Born in Greatness To Rise into a Legend". He did a lot of rhymes and poetry in high school but claimed that he never planned to venture into music but it rather 'called out' to him.

"It just called out to me. I had good grades but after I was done with school, I just told my mum I wanted to do music. She wasn't surprised because she told me when she met my dad he was a DJ. She said she would support me and she has been very supportive ever since. I started in 2011 and the journey has been dope; but like any other journey, you have your ups and downs. It hasn't been easy but then in life nothing is easy." - BigTril

Rowland started out by battle rapping also known as underground rap while still in Makerere University at Club Rouge and Nana hostel. It was during one of these rapping sessions that he hooked up with GNL Zamba (GNL popularized Lugaflow before relocating to the United States) who signed him to Baboon Forest Entertainment. He worked with BFE for three years before working as a radio host on X Fm (a radio station in Uganda). During this time, he released minor hit singles that failed to gain popularity outside Uganda such as "Push Harder" in 2012, "Pretty Girls" in 2015, "Bad Gyal Ting" in 2017 and "Giddem".

Rowland left Baboon Forest Entertainment when he met John Obas Isokpehi, CEO of Striker Entertainment, a Nigerian label based in Uganda who got him signed.

2019-Present: Breakthrough with "Parte After Parte" and planned upcoming debut concert
Rowland released his breakthrough single "Parte After Parte" in August 2019 with the official music video on 13 September 2019. It currently have 2.1million  views on YouTube. The song received a lot of airplay in places outside Uganda including Nigeria, South Africa and Kenya where it became gained popularity after Rowland performed it during the Nyege Nyege festival, eventually becoming an unofficial anthem. It peaked at number one on the African Music Chart. It peaked at number one on the Apple Music Top 100 charts in Uganda, Kenya, Zambia and Malawi and number two on the Apple Music Top 100: Nigeria chart behind Davido and Popcaan's "Risky". It also peaked at number one on BBC Radio 1Xtra's DJ Edo DNA's Top 5 countdown. It also peaked in the top 10 positions on the Boomplay Music Top 100: Nigeria chart. BigTril planned to embark on his debut concert in early 2020 sometime in the month of March.

Live Performances
BigTril has performed with numerous popular African artistes such as Wizkid who he has performed with twice at Kololo and at Starboy Fest, Kizz Daniel and Naira Marley at Marlian Fest. Apart from his planned debut concert, he also planned to perform at Ghana's Afrochella concert.
His biggest single, "Parte After Parte", gained recognition in Kenya after he performed it during the four-day Nyege Nyege festival two weeks after its release. It became an unofficial Nyege Nyege festival anthem.

Possible Future Collaborations
During a five-day trip in Uganda, Nigerian-American singer and rapper, Jidenna revealed plans of a possible collaboration with BigTril, Eddy Kenzo and Fik Fameica.

Sailors, a Kenyan group known for their "Wamlambez" single and BigTril performed at the Valentine's Jamboree Concert in Nairobi where they talked about the possibility of a collaboration. At Ole Sereni Hotel, Miracle Baby, lead singer of Sailors said, "Artistes talk to each other and when they meet, they attract each other, so a collab is coming." BigTril who has a growing interest in Kenya's music scene with songs like "Wamlambez" and "Figa" also voiced the possibility of a collaboration.

In a tweet, DJ Tunez (Wizkid's main producer and DJ) hinted at a collaboration between the two artistes.

Parte After Parte (single)

Background and inspiration
BigTril has discussed the inspiration behind the song saying it came when he was in the studio and decided to take a break when he got no vibe. He watched a video on Instagram. The clip was taken from a TV interview with Ugandan-American pastor, Martin Ssempa on NBS Television in December 2012. Martin Ssempa made controversial comments while talking about the LGBTQ community. In a heated argument with an LGBTQ rights activist, Ssempe complained about how the youth only care about the glamorous life of partying day after day, "party, after party".

BigTril replaced the 'y' in 'party' with 'e' so it became 'parte' which he repeated over and over until it became a catchy hook. He produced the beat and wrote the song on the same day.

Composition
"Parte After Parte" is a hip-hop/rap song that runs for two minutes and forty-seven seconds with a fast beat which sounds like an early 2000s hip-hop song from any Anglophone African country with arrangements of a suo or konto sound infused in it.

Promotion and popularity
BigTril performed the song during the four-day Nyege Nyege festival held in Jinja, Kenya two weeks after its release. It became an unofficial Nyege Nyege festival anthem.

The song grew more popular when it was used in memes that circulated round the internet catching the attention of Nigerian, South African and Kenyan citizens as well as other nations.

Nigerian artistes such as Wizkid, Davido, Zlatan Ibile, and Olamide expressed their love for the song with Wizkid endorsing it and Davido calling it a 'nice song'. Olamide was seen singing to it in a video he posted on social media. Mayorkun, another Nigerian artist also posted a video of him singing the song on his Instagram story.

Its popularity was not limited to only African nations. American Grammy Award winning rapper, Cardi B posted a video of her and husband, Offset singing and dancing to the song while leaving a bar on the latter's birthday.

"Parte After Parte" was one of ten African songs listed in The Guardian's 2019 in African pop: 10 must-listen tracks published on Christmas Eve 2019.

Music video
An official music video directed by Kino Filmz was released on 13 September 2019. It hit a million views after three months. As of September 2020, the video has 1.9 million views. It's still growing up as it currently have 2.1 million views as of October 2022.

Commercial performance
"Parte After Parte" peaked at number one on the Apple Music Top 100 charts in  Uganda, Kenya, Zambia and Malawi. It charted at the 11th, 8th and 6th places before peaking at number two on the Apple Music Top 100: Nigeria chart behind Davido and Popcaan's "Risky". It also peaked at number one on BBC Radio 1Xtra's DJ Edu DNA's Top 5 countdown.

Possible remix
BigTril said that some Nigerian and South African artistes have approached him to record a remix but he knows some Kenyan artistes who can make the cut.

Artistry

Influences
Rowland draws inspiration from Jay-Z, Notorious B.I.G. and Kanye West. Rowland is a big fan of Kenyan artistes such as Madtraxx, Sauti Sol and Khaligraph Jones. He admires rapper, Keko and Klear Kut legend, Navio (rapper).

Genre
As a rapper, Rowland's songs are mainly hip-hop. However, when asked about his genre, he said, 
"I don't belong to any genre, that's putting labels on art. I believe art is formless and the best way to express yourself. I've always been a rapper but now I produce my own music. I produced "Parte After Parte" myself. Since I started production, I don't want to box myself into any genre. I'm a vibes creator. As long as it's a vibe and I can imagine it, then I create it."

Style
BigTril raps in a mixture of English and Luganda.

Personal life
Rowland is currently single but said he could wed a Kenyan woman if she was suitable. He has called Ugandan female model, Lydia Jazmine the "hottest model".

Rowland has been open on how depression almost ruined his career before meeting John Obas Isokpehi, the CEO of Striker Entertainment.

Tattoos
On his tattoos, "Yeah, I have three. I have the eagle, mantra and star for King David. Eagles fly alone in the clouds, the mantra signifies knowledge and King David defeated Goliath. He inspires me to take on challenges.

Comments on Ugandan 2021 Presidential Candidate, Robert Kyagulanyi Ssentamu
When Kyadondo East lawmaker, Robert Kyagulanyi Ssentamu also known by his stage name Bobi Wine, announced his bid to run for President in the Ugandan 2021 general election, BigTril noted that he will be disappointed if his manifesto doesn't include enforcing the copyright law in Uganda to protect content creators for the years he has been in the culture and creative industry. This was days after he complained of Uganda's music industry being broke.

"If Bobi Wine doesn't talk about enforcing the copyright law in Uganda to protect content creators in his manifesto then I'll be really disappointed" - BigTril

Awards and nominations
BigTril has won two Buzz Teeniez Awards for Hottest Hip-Hop Song of the Year and Hottest Song of the Year for "Parte After Parte" in 2019. BigTril won a Zzina award in 2020 in the Best Lugaflow/Rap Song category for "Parte After Parte".

Discography
Singles
Wangi
Batuwulira (featuring Fille Mutoni)
Giddem (featuring Beenie Gunter)
Awo
No Yawa
Sibalaba
Rollin Dank
She Got Me Blind (2011)
Push Harder (2012)
Your Ways (2014)
Pretty Girls (2015)
Bad Gyal Ting' (2017)
Faya (2017)
Why They Hate (2018)
We Good (2018)
Parte After Parte (2019)
Feel like ft FlexD' Paper
Og ft Vector,Larry gaaga,raezy.
Mamacita.

References

Ugandan rappers
Makerere University alumni
Living people
1990 births